Hana Basic (born 22 January 1996) is an Australian sprinter who competes in the 100 metres. Basic was selected to represent Australia at the 2020 Summer Olympics in the women's 100 m event. 

She is currently studying a Bachelor of Health and Physical Education at Deakin University.

Early years
Basic was born in Melbourne, Australia to father Armin from Banja Luka who ran a café and mother Zana, a lawyer from Mostar. The Basic family fled to Australia just three years before she was born at the start of the Bosnian War. She also has an older sister named Mia. Bosnian was her first language, as she only learned English in primary school.

Basic started playing sport as a gymnast when she was in pre-school. When she was 9 years old her primary school Physical Education teacher saw her athletics potential and encouraged her to go to Nunawading Little Athletics. Basic went to her first nationals in the Under-10s for high jump and long jump. By the age of 14, she was already running under 12 seconds for the 100m and winning national sprint titles. Basic decided to make running her priority.

Athletics career
Basic earned a scholarship to Carey Grammar School and went to the 2014 World Junior Championships in Athletics held in Eugene, Oregon and ran a personal best of 11.64 seconds for the 100 metres that year. With her coach John Nicolosi, she changed her diet, and her training.

On 17 April 2021 she won the Australian National Championship 100 metres in a time of 11.23 seconds. Just prior to that at the Queensland Classic she had clocked a new personal best of 11.18 to become the fourth fastest woman in Australian history. She then improved her personal best to 11.16 at Meeting de la Gruyere in Bulle, Switzerland.

She represented Australia in the 100 metres at the  2020 Tokyo Olympics, where she finished fifth in her heat running 11.32 seconds, and failed to advance to the semi-finals.

References

1996 births
Living people
Australian female sprinters
Australian people of Bosnia and Herzegovina descent
People educated at Carey Baptist Grammar School
Place of birth missing (living people)
Athletes (track and field) at the 2020 Summer Olympics
Olympic athletes of Australia
Olympic female sprinters